Jensen Distribution Services, based in Spokane, Washington, is a wholesale hardware distributor that services over 2,000 customers in 11 western states. Jensen Distribution Services is a member and owner of Distribution America, with members throughout the United States and $2 billion in buying clout. Jensen Distribution Services carries over 52,000 items. Departments include household hardware, hand and power tools, electrical, plumbing, paint and sundries, outdoor living, housewares, automotive, and lawn & garden products.

History
O.C. Jensen and Henry Brooke founded Jensen, Brooke & Company, a hardware business, in 1883. Brooke later sold his interest in the company to Charles King and the business was renamed Jensen King & Co. in 1895. The company merged with Wolverton and Byrd and moved to Spokane where it incorporated under the name Jensen-King-Byrd. Jensen's sons, Alvin L. and J. Scott Jensen bought out King's interest in the company in 1925 and changed the name of the business to Jensen-Byrd Co.

Jensen-Byrd Co. acquired the Spokane branch of Marshall Wells in 1958 and Pacific Marine Schwabacher in 1981. In 1995, Jensen-Byrd Co. changed its name to Jensen Distribution Services.

References

External links
Official website

Business services companies established in 1883
Retail companies established in 1883
Companies based in Spokane, Washington
Distribution companies of the United States